Gaillardia arizonica, the Arizonia blanketflower, is a species of flowering plant in the sunflower family. It is native to northwestern Mexico (Sonora) and the southwestern United States (Arizona, southern Nevada, southern Utah).

Gaillardia arizonica grows in sandy washes and alluvial deposits in desert regions. Each head has 10–16 yellow or orange ray flowers surrounding 40–100 yellow disc flowers.

References

External links
Lady Bird Johnson Wildflower Center, University of Texas

arizonica
Flora of Arizona
Flora of Nevada
Flora of Sonora
Flora of Utah
Plants described in 1884
Taxa named by Asa Gray
Flora without expected TNC conservation status